Thomas Dinkel (born July 25, 1956) is a former professional American football linebacker in the National Football League.

Football career
He played college football for the Kansas Jayhawks. He was selected by the Cincinnati Bengals in the 5th round (126th overall pick) of the 1978 NFL Draft. He played seven seasons for the Cincinnati Bengals.

References

1956 births
Living people
Sportspeople from Topeka, Kansas
Players of American football from Kansas
American football linebackers
Kansas Jayhawks football players
Cincinnati Bengals players
Jacksonville Bulls players